is a former Japanese actress who was affiliated with Stardust Promotion. She is best known for playing the role of Ranru Itsuki / Abare Yellow in the 2003 Super Sentai TV series Bakuryū Sentai Abaranger.

Biography
In 1999, Itō debuted in a commercial for Otsuka Pharmaceutical. In 2000, her first appearance as a cut model in the September issue of the magazine CanCam. In 2002, Itō, with models such as Mika Hijii, appeared on the visual unit Chao. The same year, they became the idle unit D★shues released a CD. In 2003, she appeared in Bakuryū Sentai Abaranger as Ranru Itsuki/Abare Yellow. In 2005, Itō played a role of a student for three months topic English Hāto de kanjiru eibunhō (NHK Educational TV), the next year she appeared in colleague in the Conversation Edition. In 2006, her first main role in a film was Love saiko-kyōwaku no horā "Saikō no kareshi". The same year, Itō played the leading role as Shiori Sano in the TBS Ai no gekijō, Suites Dream. In 2007, she was earnest to advance stage from, she appeared in the center of the blockbuster. In 2008, Itō played the leading role as Tamaki Nanase in Fuji TV daytime drama series Aishū no Romera. In 2009, she appeared in Fuji TV's Hontoniattakowaihanashi. In March 17, 2010, Itō married to a construction company executive which was announced on February 10. In November 2010, she left the Stardust Promotion agency and retired from acting the following December. In 2012, Itō was appointed to the narrator of Iwakuni Museum in Iwakuni, Yamaguchi Prefecture.

Filmography

Television

Film

References

1980 births
Living people
Actresses from Yokohama
Former Stardust Promotion artists